HOV Services is a publicly quoted business process outsourcing company that operates in North America with multiple locations in the U.S., and international headquarters in Chennai, India.

In February 2007, HOV Services acquired Lason, Inc. a provider of document management outsourcing services, including imaging, mail processing, data capture, document DNATM, and output.

The two companies combined will have trailing annual revenues in excess of $200 million, and a global workforce of more than 11,000 employees serving more than 50% of the Fortune 100 companies with an active client base numbering over 4,000.

In May 2011, HOV Services merged with SourceCORP, a U.S. company to create SourceHOV, an information technology firm based in Dallas, Texas.

A branch also opened in Olongapo City, Philippines(SourceCORP).

References

Multinational companies
Outsourcing companies